Mud Creek is a stream in Pike County in the U.S. state of Missouri. It is a tributary of Ramsey Creek.

Mud Creek was so named on account of the muddy character of its water.

See also
List of rivers of Missouri

References

Rivers of Pike County, Missouri
Rivers of Missouri